John Knatchbull is the name of:

Sir John Knatchbull, 2nd Baronet (c. 1630–1696), English MP for Kent and New Romney
John Knatchbull (Royal Navy captain) (died 1844), British naval captain and convict found guilty of murder
John Knatchbull, 7th Baron Brabourne (1924–2005), British peer, television producer and Academy Award nominated film producer